MASER is a sounding rocket that is used in the MASER microgravity research rocket programme, which is operated by the Swedish Space Corporation (SSC). The main customer is the European Space Agency (ESA), and in particular its EMIR and ELIPS programmes. MASER stands for "MAterials Science Experiment Rocket".

The launches take place at Esrange in Northern Sweden. The programme offers 6-7 minutes of microgravity and full recovery of the experiment modules with helicopter immediately after flight.

Missions

See also

 Maxus
 Texus
 Rexus and Bexus
 Esrange

References

 
 

Sounding rockets of Sweden
Space programme of Sweden